The 1988 Atlanta Falcons season was the franchise’s 23rd season in the National Football League (NFL). The team was marred by tragedy when cornerback David Croudip died on October 10 after a cocaine overdose. It would be the first of three player deaths of the team in the space of two seasons.

Offseason

NFL Draft

Personnel

Staff

Roster

Regular season

Schedule

Standings

References

External links 
 1988 Atlanta Falcons at Pro-Football-Reference.com

Atlanta
Atlanta Falcons seasons
Atlanta